Philodromus is a genus of philodromid crab spiders. Spiders in this genus are distinctively flattened.

The more than 250 described species are distributed throughout the Holarctic region, with few species reaching into more southern regions. Some are found in certain parts of Africa, with sporadic species occurring up to Australia. Only one species (P. traviatus) is found in (northern) South America. 16 species occur in Central Europe.

Species 

Selected examples of Philodromus species:
 
 P. aureolus
 P. cespitum
 P. dispar
 P. fallax
 P. margaritatus
 P. rufus
 P. rufus vibrans
 P. vulgaris

Dubious names

Nomina dubia (dubious names) include:
Philodromus depriesteri (Braun, 1965)
Philodromus micans (Menge, 1875)

Gallery

References 

 Dondale, C.D. (1963). Florida Spiders in the rufus Group in the Genus Philodromus (Araneae: Thomisidae). Psyche 70:34-43 PDF

External links 

 
Araneomorphae genera
Cosmopolitan spiders
Articles containing video clips